Doctor Who: The Music is a 1983 compilation of music from the BBC Radiophonic Workshop featuring incidental music from the popular science-fiction television series Doctor Who. The album was the first full-length to feature solely music from the programme. The collection was produced by Workshop member and long-time Doctor Who sound-effects creator Dick Mills. It featured the original Delia Derbyshire arrangement of Ron Grainer's theme tune and music by Malcolm Clarke from the 1972 serial "The Sea Devils", which was only the second to have an incidental score provided completely by the Radiophonic Workshop. Most of the music included came from serials from the previous three years to demonstrate the recent composers' works. For the album, each serial's incidental music was reassembled into short "suites" and although most of the music had been recorded in mono it was, for this compilation, remixed into stereo with sound effects added on to some tracks. The album was re-released in 1992 by Silva Screen records as Earthshock - Classic Music From The BBC Radiophonic Workshop Volume 1, with bonus tracks including "The Worlds of Doctor Who", a track recorded by Mills as a B-side to Dudley Simpson's 1973 "Moonbase 3" single, which featured a mix of music with sound effects from Planet of the Daleks before following with Simpson's "Master's Theme" and finishing with music from the serial The Mind of Evil . Selections from both this compilation and its follow-up, Doctor Who: The Music II, were also re-used on the 1994 Silva Screen compilation The Best of Doctor Who Volume 1: The Five Doctors.

Track listing

Original 1983 track listing

1992 Earthshock track listing

External links
mb21 Discography entry
Album information

BBC Radiophonic Workshop albums
Music
1983 compilation albums
BBC Records compilation albums
BBC Records soundtracks
Soundtrack compilation albums
Silva Screen Records compilation albums
Silva Screen Records soundtracks